Love Trilogy is a 2004 Hong Kong-Chinese film starring Francis Ng, Anita Yuen, Ruby Lin, Michael Chow, Lu Yi and Han Xiao. It was directed by Derek Chiu. The title used in Hong Kong is Love Trilogy, while title used in China is Falling in Love with Heaven & Earth (我爱天上人间 / Wo Ai Tian Shan Ren Jian)

Plot
Three couples in love arrive in Yunnan to tour Shibo Yuan and meet the tour guide Liu Hai. The tour guide forms her own opinions of the couples and, over the course of giving a tour of Shibo Yuan, acts as an intermediary many times and helps them settle their disputes but also stirs up trouble.

The red couple
The first couple arriving for the tour are Mark and his wife Chui from Hong Kong. The childhood friends have been married for seven years and want to travel the road together for the latter half of their lives. Due to the market crash the year before, both are busy all day and their feelings for each other are starting to diminish.

The white couple
The second couple arriving for the tour are from Shanghai. Xu Jing and Bai Sheng just got married and are on their honeymoon. Bai Sheng is a workaholic, unknowingly neglecting Xu Jing. Xu Jing gave herself a pregnancy test at the clinic where she works and found out that she is expecting, causing her worry because Bai Sheng doesn't want to become a father yet.

The blue couple
The third couple traveling are from South Korea. Jino and his girlfriend BoBo are a young couple who have been dating for only about six months. Jino is romantic while BoBo is vain but in tune with reality.

Cast
 Francis Ng - Mark Lao (about 30 years old)
 Anita Yuen - Chui (28 years old)
 Ruby Lin - Liu Hai (20 years old)
 Lu Yi - Bai Sheng (26 years old) 
 Michael Chow - Li Caishun
 Han Xiao - Xu Jing (23 years old)
 Ji-ho Oh - Jino (20 years old)
 Yin Yi Li - BoBo (23 years old)

Production
The film is set and was filmed in Yunnan's Shangrila.

Director Derek Chiu explained that the film's three love stories divide into the sections "White, Blue, Red".

References

External links

Love Trilogy @ Sohu 
Love Trilogy @ HK Film

2004 films
2000s Mandarin-language films
2000s Cantonese-language films
2000s Korean-language films
Chinese romantic drama films
Hong Kong romantic drama films
Films set in Yunnan
2004 romantic drama films
2000s Hong Kong films